Transparency International is an international umbrella organization based in Berlin, Germany.

It may also refer to the national member organizations of Transparency International:
Transparency International Bangladesh
Transparency International Canada
Transparency International Slovakia